The 1997–98 Toronto Maple Leafs season was Toronto's 81st season in the National Hockey League (NHL), their last full season playing at Maple Leaf Gardens, and their last season playing in the Western Conference. Just a few days before the season's start, Mats Sundin became their 17th captain and their first European captain in their 80-year history. The Maple Leafs did not qualify for the playoffs for the second consecutive season.

Off-season

Regular season

Final standings

Schedule and results

Player statistics

Regular season
Scoring

Goaltending

Awards and records

Transactions
The Maple Leafs have been involved in the following transactions during the 1997–98 season.

Trades

Expansion Draft

Free agents

Draft picks

Farm teams
 The Maple Leafs farm team was the St. John's Maple Leafs in St. John's, Newfoundland.

References
 Maple Leafs on Hockey Database

Toronto Maple Leafs seasons
Toronto Maple Leafs season, 1997-98
Toronto